The Þór Akureyri men's football team, commonly known as Þór Akureyri, is the men's football department of Þór Akureyri multi sports club, based in the town of Akureyri in Iceland.

History
On September 18, 2010, Þór won against Fjarðabyggð to move into second place in the second division of Icelandic football, 1. deild karla. Going into the game, Þór had to win and they also needed Leiknir to lose in order to go into second place since Leiknir was 3 points clear of them. This was their last gasp to reach promotion to the top flight football of Iceland, Úrvalsdeild. Even though Þór already had a superior goal difference, they defeated Fjarðabyggðar 9–1 in a thrashing. Leiknir played their match at the same time and so knew they needed to at least draw to earn promotion as the scoreline was always in Þór's favor. However, only 5 minutes into the game Leiknir's opponent Fjölnir scored on a strike from forward Pétur Georg Markan. Leiknir found a response in the 44th minute, but it would not be enough. Just before the half, Pétur added a second goal for Fjölnir. Then, came the dagger, a 47th-minute strike by none other than Pétur to begin the second half left Leiknir stunned. He had completed his treble and although Leiknir was not out of it by any means, they would not be able to pull another goal back.

In the first meeting of the season between the two Reykjavík teams, with five minutes remaining and Leiknir winning 3–2, Fjölnir leveled in the 87th minute. Then in stoppage time, Aron Jóhannsson completed his treble for Fjölnir and Leiknir had lost. So, Þór returned to top flight for the first time since 2002, finishing runner-up to Víkingur Reykjavík.

In 2011, Þór lost to KR, 0-2, in the Icelandic Cup finals.

Current squad

Former players
For details of current and former players, see :Category:Þór Akureyri players.

Managers
 Páll Viðar Gíslason (July 1, 2009 – October 4, 2014)
 Halldór Jón Sigurðsson (January 1, 2015 – September 24, 2016)
 Lárus Sigurðsson (September 29, 2016 – October 5, 2018)
 Gregg Ryder (October 5, 2018 – September 21, 2019)
 Páll Viðar Gíslason (October 18, 2019-)

References

External links
Official site 

Football clubs in Iceland
Akureyri
1915 establishments in Iceland